Miklós Orosz (born 11 April 1885, date of death unknown) was a Hungarian wrestler. He competed in the men's Greco-Roman middleweight at the 1908 Summer Olympics.

References

External links
 

1885 births
Year of death missing
Hungarian male sport wrestlers
Olympic wrestlers of Hungary
Wrestlers at the 1908 Summer Olympics
Place of birth missing